Harold Buckley Willis (9 February 1890 – 18 April 1962), was a member of the Lafayette Escadrille during World War I and designed the insignia for the squadron.

Early life
Born February 9, 1890, in Boston, Massachusetts to John B. and Myrta (Gale) Willis.
Harold attended Newton High School and graduated from Harvard College Class of 1912.

World War I
He enlisted in the American Ambulance Field Service in February 1915, and arrived at the western front, with Section 2, at Pont-a-Mousson, in April 1915.  From February to May he served with the Ambulance at Verdun.  He was cited July 4, 1915, "for rescue of wounded under fire," offensive Bois-le-Pretre, "Croix de Guerre with Star."

In June 1915, he enlisted in the Foreign Legion of the French Army, and transferred to 2d Groupe d'Aviation.  He was brevetted pilot on Bleriot at Buc.  He trained successively at Nieuport Perfectionnement School, at Avord; Machine-Gun School, Cazaux; Combat and Acrobatics, at Pau; Spad, at Plessis Belleville.

Willis arrived on the Somme front with the Lafayette Escadrille (N 124) in March, 1917.  Soon after arriving Willis redesigned the squadron insignia changing it from a Seminole warrior to a Sioux warrior. The original indian head was printed on boxes of ammunition marked "Savage Arms Manufacturing Company". This company was providing ammunition for machine guns used by reconnaissance units and bombers of the French military aviation.

Sgt. Willis, was captured after an aerial battle, probably against Lt. Wilhelm Schulz of Jasta 16b, 18 August 1917. The aircraft was hit numerous times with damage to the engine which forced the pilot to land in German territory near Convensoye, France.

He wrote of his capture in a letter written from a Westphalian prison camp:
This is the first chance I have had to write you a long letter I have heard nothing from the outside yet, but am hopeful. Hope is all that keeps us going. I will tell you how I happened to be the first in the Escadrille to be taken alive — a dubious distinction.  We were protecting a group of bombing planes on a daylight raid some distance in enemy territory.  Suddenly we were attacked by a rather energetic patrol of monoplaces, and a general mix up ensued.  One of our planes in front of me was attacked and I was able to 'crock' the German — short lived satisfaction.  The monoplace was protected by two others which in turn attacked me from behind riddling my machine To continue in a straight line was fatal So I did a renversement and attacked — my only defense.

Immediately, of course, I was separated from our group, which continued.  It would not have been so bad had my motor not been touched at the first volley.  It worked only intermittently causing loss of height.  We had a wild fight almost to the ground.  I did all sorts of stunts to avoid fire on the line of flight.  The enemy flew well.  We missed collision twice by inches.  I was badly raked by cross fire; music of bullets striking motor and cables.  Toward the end my wind-shield was shattered and my goggles broken by a ball which slightly stunned me.  I had an awful feeling of despair at the thought of the inevitable landing in Germany.  As I neared the ground I had an instant's desire to dive into it — saw a wood in front of me, jumped it and landed instinctively on the crest of a hill.  One of the Germans flew over me waved his hand turned and landed followed by his two comrades.

All saluted very politely as they came up — young chaps perfectly correct.  My machine was a wreck thirty bullets in the fuselage motor and radiator exactly half of the cables cut tires punctured and wings riddled.  It was a beautiful machine and had always served me well.  Too bad!

The aviators took me to lunch at their quarters where I awaited a motor which took me to a prison in a fortress.  One always expects to be either killed or wounded — never taken.  So I had left the ground in two sweaters no coat and with no money.  Confess I cried like a baby when I was finally alone in my cell.  The first three days were terrible.  One is not glad to be alive, especially when one wakes, forgets for a moment where one is, and then remembers.  Pleasantest are the nights, for one always has vivid dreams of home or the Front You can understand how wearing it is, to be helpless — a sort of living corpse — when there is need of every one. I try not to think of it.
Willis was interned in the prison camps of Montmedy, Carlsruhe, Landshut, Giitersloh, reprisal camp Eutin, Bad Stuer, Mecklenburg-Schwerin, Magdeburg, Wurzburg, and Villingen, during 14 months of captivity.  After several attempts, Willis disguised as a German guard, made his escape from the American camp at Villingen on Oct. 4, 1918, crossing the Rhine river into Switzerland and finally back to Paris.

On arriving at Paris, Willis was awarded the Médaille Militaire and permitted to return to the Argonne front.  Returning to the US in 1919, he was honorably discharged.

He wrote his memoirs in a six-part series that appeared in The Boston Globe within a week of his arrival home. The series was issued as the book Through a Cloud of Bullets in January 2019.

World War II

During World War II, Willis served in the U.S. Army Air Force as a major in Africa, England and France. He left the Air Force after the war as a colonel.

Willis was successful in convincing the U.S. government to transfer 12 Curtiss P-40 Warhawks to the Free French Fighter Group GC II/5 based in North Africa. These aircraft were painted with the Lafayette Escadrille insignia emblazoned on their fuselages.

References

External links

 Americans in the French Air Service New England Air Museum
 New England Aviators: Harold Buckley Willis, Sous-Lieutenant, Lafayette Escadrille
 Lafayette Escadrille National Museum of the US Air Force
 The Field Service Takes to the Air: The Lafayette Escadrille
 Coat, Service, French Air Service, Lafayette Escadrille, Harold B. Willis Smithsonian National Air and Space Museum
 Curtiss P-40 au Lafayette Maquette 72
 Through a Cloud of Bullets Harold B. Willis

1890 births
1962 deaths
American military personnel of World War I
Recipients of the Croix de Guerre 1914–1918 (France)
Harvard College alumni
Newton North High School alumni